The qualifying competition for the 1972 CONCACAF Pre-Olympic Tournament determined the four teams for the final tournament.

First round

Group 1

Group 2

Group 3

Playoff

USA qualify for the final round.

Group 4

References

CONCACAF Men's Olympic Qualifying Tournament